James Robert Russell (born October 27, 1953) is a scholar and professor in Ancient Near Eastern, Iranian and Armenian Studies. He has published extensively in journals, and has written several books.

He served as Mashtots Professor  of Armenian Studies at Department of Near Eastern Languages and Civilizations at Harvard University, and sat on the executive committee of Davis Center for Russian and Eurasian Studies.

In July 2016, Russell became semi-retired and moved his residence to Fresno, California.

As of 2023, Russell is Emeritus Mashtots Professor of Armenian Studies at Harvard University, Distinguished Visiting Professor of the Hebrew University of Jerusalem, and a part-time Lecturer in Jewish Studies and Biblical Hebrew at California State University, Fresno.

Early life and education
James Russell was born in New York City and grew up in the Washington Heights Upper Manhattan neighborhood of New York City. His parents are Jewish: his mother's ancestry was Sephardic and his father's ancestry was Ashkenazic. He was educated at The Bronx High School of Science and Columbia University [B.A. summa cum laude 1974]. He then was awarded a Kellett Fellowship which he used to study at the University of Oxford [B.Litt. 1977], under the Armenologists Nina Garsoïan and Charles Dowsett.

He earned his Ph.D. at the University of London, School of Oriental and African Studies (SOAS), under the direction of Mary Boyce. His 1982 Ph.D. dissertation was entitled "Zoroastrianism in Armenia" and later published by Harvard University Press.

Professional
Soon after finishing his Ph.D. he returned to New York City and taught at Columbia University in the Department of Middle Eastern Languages and Cultures (MELAC).

He subsequently moved to Israel to become a Lady Davis Professor at the Hebrew University of Jerusalem at the recommendation and invitation of the scholar Michael E. Stone.

By 1992, Russell was short-listed and soon accepted and was appointed to the Mashtots Chair in Armenian Studies in the Near Eastern Languages and Civilizations Department at Harvard University, succeeding Robert W. Thomson the first holder of that chair since 1969 who had returned to Oxford University in England. Russell occupied the Mashtots Chair from 1993 until his retirement.

He also taught a wide range of subjects, including freshman seminars on literature and comparative religions, literature and cultures.

He has taught and lectured in Armenia, India, and Iran and at the Oriental Institute of the Russian Academy of Sciences and Saint Petersburg State University. He was Government Fellowship Lecturer at the Cama Institute in Bombay, India.

Russell has been called, "A complex figure... (who) resists easy classification and is no stranger to controversy: reviled by Turks and Armenians alike."

He has been interviewed as an expert and scholar on The History Channel's documentary programs including Angels: Good or Evil.

Russell has been one of the three faculty advisers for the conservative fortnightly student newspaper The Harvard Salient.

He lectured on Soteriology on the Silk Road for the Buddhist Lecture Series of the University of Toronto in October 2005, and organized and chaired an international symposium in the same month to commemorate the 1600th anniversary of Saint Mesrop Mashtots, inventor of the Armenian alphabet. He has written on, translated, and analyzed the esoteric, mystical, and spiritual aspects of the writings of Gregory of Narek, and has written numerous articles for the Encyclopædia Iranica. He contributed to the New Leader magazine.

Ninety one of his selected published scholarly journal articles are gathered in his book, Armenian and Iranian Studies.

Critics
Russell's writings were criticized by Armenian historians Armen Ayvazyan and Armen Petrosyan, who conclude that Russell made gross factual mistakes together with unsubstantiated and tendentious claims concerning Armenian history and culture. Ayvazyan considers Russell, along with a number of other leading American armenologists, to be one of the representatives of the "false Western school of Armenian studies". Bert Vaux, an Associate Professor of Linguistics in the Department of Linguistics at Harvard University, claims that Russell's "chair [of Armenian Studies] is actually hurting the [Armenian] community at this point. When you call the Armenians neo-Nazis, that isn't helping the community and it's not leaving it alone - it's hurting it. You are providing fodder for people that want to attack the Armenians."

In his speech at the conference "Rethinking Armenian Studies: Past, Present, and Future" on October 4, 2002 at Harvard University in Cambridge, MA, Russell cautioned the audience against the "conspiracy theories, xenophobia, and ultra-nationalist pseudo-science [which] have come increasingly into the mainstream of Armenology in the Armenian Republic" and which have found sympathetic outlets in some of the diasporic press, where paranoia and anti-Semitism have been notably present. "It is a task of the community to set its house in order because these trends are in the end suicidal," he warned. Although Prof. Russell declines to debate such issues, he stated that "I will help with my pen what I still believe to be the great majority of Armenians to expose and destroy the sort of people who are not only dragging our field, but possibly the community itself into dangerous territory".

Personal life 
Professor Russell is the son of Dr. Charlotte Sananes Russell, a Professor Emeritus of Chemistry and Biochemistry at the City College of New York, and Joseph Brooke Russell, an attorney and arbitrator in New York. His grandfather, Sidney A. Russell, was a founder and president of Russell & Russell, publisher of out-of-print scholarly books.

James Russell lives in Fresno, California with his partner of many years, the artist, photographer, scholar of Tibetan Buddhism and literature, the educator D.E. Cordell.

Partial Russell Bibliography

Books

Zoroastrianism in Armenia (Harvard Iranian Series, 1987),  
Hovhannes Tlkurantsi and the Mediaeval Armenian Lyric Tradition (University of Pennsylvania Armenian Series, 1987), 
The Heroes of Kasht (Kasti K'Ajer): An Armenian Epic (Ann Arbor: Caravan, 2000), 
The Book of Flowers (Belmont, Massachusetts: Armenian Heritage Press, 2003),  
Armenian and Iranian Studies (selected articles, in Harvard Armenian Texts and Studies, 2004), Table of Contents
Bosphorus Nights: The Complete Lyric Poems of Bedros Tourian (Harvard Armenian Texts and Studies, 2006),  
Poets, Heroes, and their Dragons (2 vols) (Brill, 2021),

Scholarly articles

"A Poem of Grigor Narekac'i", REArm 19, 1985, pp. 435–439
"The Name of Zoroaster in Armenian", Journal of the Society for Armenian Studies 2, 1985-1986, pp. 3–10
"Zoroastrianism as the State Religion of Ancient Iran", Journal of the K. R. Cama Oriental Institute 53, Bombay, 1986, pp. 74–142
"On St. Grigor Narekatsi, His Sources and His Contemporaries", Armenian Review 41, 2-162, 1988, pp. 59–65
"Sages and Scribes at the Courts of Ancient Iran", The Sage in Israel and the Ancient Near East, J. Gammie, L. Perdue, eds., Winona Lake: Eisenbrauns, 1990, pp. 141–146
"Kartîr and Mânî: a Shamanistic Model of Their Conflict", Iranica Varia: Papers in Honor of Professor Ehsan Yarshater, Acta Iranica 30, Leiden: Brill, 1990, pp. 180–193
"Zoroastrian Elements in the Book of Esther", Irano-Judaica II, S. Shaked, A. Netzer, eds., Jerusalem, 1990, pp. 33–40
"Two Notes on Biblical Tradition and Native Epic in the 'Book of Lamentation' of St. Grigor Narekac'i", REArm 22, 1990-1991, pp. 135–145
"Virtue and Its Own Reward: The 38th Meditation of the Book of Lamentations of St. Grigor Narekatsi", Raft 1991, pp. 25–30
"On Mysticism and Esotericism amongst the Zoroastrians", Iranian Studies 26.1-2, 1993, pp. 73–94
"The Mother of All Heresies: A Late Mediaeval Armenian Text on the Yushkaparik, REArm 24, 1993, pp. 273-293
"Problematic Snake Children of Armenia", REArm 25, 1994, pp. 77–96
"Zoroastrianism and the Northern Qi Panels", Zoroastrian Studies Newsletter, Bombay, 1994
"A Parthian Bhagavad Gîtâ and its Echoes", From Byzantium to Iran: Armenian Studies in Honour of Nina Garsoian, J.-P. Mahé, R. Thomson, eds., Atlanta: Scholars Press, 1996, pp. 17-35
"Armenian Spirituality: Liturgical Mysticism and Chapter 33 of the Book of Lamentation of St. Grigor Narekac'i", REArm 26, 1996–1997, pp. 427–439
"Polyphemos Armenios", REArm 26, 1996-1997, pp. 25-38
"Scythians and Avesta in an Armenian Vernacular Paternoster", Le Muséon 110.1-2, 1997, pp. 91-114.
"A Manichaean Apostolic Mission to Armenia?", Proceedings of the Third European Conference of Iranian Studies, 1, N. Sims-Williams, ed., Wiesbaden: L. Reichert, 1998, pp. 21-26
"Truth Is What the Eye Can See: Armenian Manuscripts and Armenian Spirituality", Treasures in Heaven: Armenian Art, Religion, and Society, T. Mathews, R. Wieck, eds., New York: Pierpont Morgan Library, 1998, pp. 147-162
"The Armenian Shrines of the Black Youth (t'ux manuk)", Le Muséon 111.3-4, 1998, pp. 319-343
"An Epic for the Borderlands: Zariadris of Sophene, Aslan the Rebel, Digenes Akrites, and the Mythologem of Alcestis in Armenia", Armenian Tsopk/Kharpert, R. Hovannisian, ed., Costa Mesa, California: Mazda, 1998, pp. 147-183
"A Scholium on Coleridge and an Armenian Demon", JSAS 10, 1998-99, 2000, pp. 63-71
"God is Good: On Tobit and Iran", Iran and the Caucasus 5, Tehran, 2001, pp. 1-6
"The Magi in the Derveni Papyrus", Nâme-ye Irân-e Bâstân 1.1, Tehran, 2001, pp. 49-59
"Ezekiel and Iran", Irano-Judaica V, Shaul Shaked and Amnon Netzer, eds., Jerusalem: Ben-Zri Institute, 2003, pp. 1-15

Irano-Judaica V, Shaul Shaked and Amnon Netzer, eds., Jerusalem: Ben-Zri Institute, 2003, pp. 1-15

Representative articles in the Encyclopædia Iranica
Religion of Armenia
BEHDEN, Zoroastrianism or its adherents
BOZPAYIT, Body of Zoroastrian teachings in Sasanian period
BURIAL iii., Zoroastrian burial practices
CAMA Kharshedji Rustamji, Parsi Zoroastrian scholar and community leader, India, 19th
CEDRENUS Georgius, Byzentine historian dealing with Zoroaster, 12th
Christianity in pre-Islamic Persia, literary sources
AÙAR˜EAN, Linguist, Armenian, 19th 20th
ATRUˆAN, Fire temple, a Parthian loanword in Armenian
ÙAÚDOR ii., Veil, among Zoroastrians and Parsis
AÚL, Child-stealing demon
ANUˆAWAN, Legendary king of Armenia
ARA the Beautiful, Mythical king of Armenia
ARLEZ, Armenian term for a supernatural creature
ARTAXIAS I, Founder of Artaxiad dynasty in Armenia, 2nd BC
AÛDAHAÚ iv., Dragon in Armenia
BAAT ii., Family head of ˆaharu@n^, Armenian dynasty, 4th
BÈNAMAÚZÈ i., Menstruant woman, Zoroastrian concept for ritual
BURDAR, Armenian proper name for a Persian nobleman, 4th
CUPBEARER, Ancient Armenian function of a courtier

Popular articles
 An Essay on the Origins of The Armenian People (1981)
 Letter to The New York Review of Books, The New York Review of Books, 9 August 2001.
 O Captain! My Captain!, The Harvard Crimson,  Friday, March 03, 2006. On the resignation of former President of Harvard University Larry Summers
 Ideology over Integrity in Academe, The Current, Columbia University, Fall 2007 issue.

References

External links
 
 Professor James R. Russell's page at Harvard University (archived 2016)
 Review of  Dr. Russell's Armenian and Iranian Studies by Dr. Michael Stone
 Kavulla, Travis R., "A Small Niche for Great BooksAn Armenian Studies professor's lonely accomplishment in general education", The Harvard Crimson, January 20, 2006. Article on Russell's Literature Humanities course.
Harvard University Department of Near Eastern Languages and Civilizations Newsletter, Spring 2004. Special mention of Prof. Russell having published a translation and study, with the Armenian text, of "The Book of Flowers". )archived November 2004)
Harvard University Department of Near Eastern Languages and Civilizations Newsletter, Spring 2006, cf. page 4. (archived June 2006)
Harvard University Department of Near Eastern Languages and Civilizations Newsletter, Fall 2006, cf. page 6. (archived December 2006)
 Ziabariby Kourosh, "Interview with Prof. James Russell: Iran should return to its former global position again", Ovi magazine, 2008-12-30

1953 births
Living people
Harvard University faculty
Columbia College (New York) alumni
Alumni of the University of Oxford
Alumni of SOAS University of London
Armenian studies scholars
Iranologists
Jewish American historians
American male non-fiction writers
People from Washington Heights, Manhattan
21st-century American historians
21st-century American male writers
Historians from New York (state)
Columbia University faculty
21st-century American Jews